Yalta Hotel Complex is a hotel in Yalta (Crimea), set in Massandra park on the Black Sea coast. It is one of the major tourist centers in Crimea.

History 
Yalta-Intourist Hotel Complex was built in 1977 with joint effort of Krymspetsstroy local construction company and Union Engineering INGA (Yugoslavia). The design work was performed by A.T. Polyansky, member of the USSR Academy of Fine Arts, architect I.N. Mokshunova, and civil engineers K.N. Vasiliev and Ya.I. Dukhovny. 
The original design allocated floors 2 to 15 for guest rooms, and lower floors were occupied by public facilities such as cafes, bars, restaurants, an excursion bureau, a souvenir shop, a variety theatre, a post office, and hairdresser’s and barber shops, with independent access to all of those. The top floor with a panoramic view of the environs featured a concert/cinema hall, restaurant, and a sunroom terrace.
The beautifully landscaped deck park around the hotel complex was built as a natural extension of the early 19th century Massandra park. The new park features the Amphora alley, the cypress tree ground, the plane tree ground, the chestnut tree ground, a ‘scalinada’ (steep stairs running up the hill), and fountains ‘Cascade’ and ‘Flora’.

Architectural and artistic features 
The concept of the hotel complex exterior and interior decoration was developed with participation of Zurab Tsereteli, a famous muralist, painter and sculptor.  The essential idea underlying the artistic concept is the poetic world of the Crimean legends. The main building of the hotel reminds one of an ocean liner crowned with a light boat of the ancient seamen. The copper storiated high relief composition above the grand entrance to the hotel is called “the Legends of Crimea” and features the silhouette of the Mount Ayu-Dag, the founders of the city of Yalta, the orchards and villages of the first inhabitants of the Crimean South Coast,  the heroes of the Crimean legend about the Adalars (the winged boys), and Maria from the legend of the Bakhchisaray Palace captive. The central hotel lobby used to be decorated with a laced decoration in the shape of a fishing net. The entrance to the Marble restaurant had marble quadrae of fine bas-relief representing the light dance of the girls from the ancient Greek town of Chersonessus. Such distinct signs of the hand of the grand master of arts can be noticed in almost all of the hotel complex premises.

Hotel infrastructure 
In 1978.
By 1978, the hotel’s complex infrastructure included: two 2500-seat restaurants, several cafes, bars, souvenir shops, three swimming pools (one Olympic-size, one diving pool and one paddling pool), and a beach (maximum capacity: 3000) with bars and cafes, changing rooms, saunas, a first aid station and beach and sports equipment rental. 

At present, the hotel’s room capacity consists of 1140 rooms of different types (980 standard, 134 semi-deluxe, and 26 de luxe rooms), each featuring a balcony showcasing a scenic view of the sea, the mountains, and the city of Yalta below. 

Restaurants with a wide range of gala and banquet halls, bars and cafes, both indoor and beachfront.  
Conference halls, meeting rooms, regular office facilities; conferencing and exhibition equipment.

Excursions, trips and transport services 
The hotel complex consists of 2 heated sea water swimming pools (an Olympic-size and a paddling pool with water slides), own beach, 3 tennis courts, 2 saunas, a gym, a dolphinarium, childcare, a variety theatre, a disco, and a billiard hall. 
International events 
The hotel complex has been a venue for such international events as: the summit meeting of the Black Sea basin countries policy-makers, the 41st Congress of FIJET, a UN conference on human rights, several international UNESCO conferences, international meetings of journalists, international meeting of media executives, European Community and NАТО seminars, an international conference "Energy Club of Ukraine and the CIS", and a BSEC congress.

Notes

External links
Official site

Hotels in Yalta
Hotels built in the Soviet Union
Hotels established in 1977
Hotel buildings completed in 1977
1977 establishments in Ukraine